In the United States, abolitionism, the movement that sought to end slavery in the country, was active from the late colonial era until the American Civil War, the end of which brought about the abolition of American slavery through the Thirteenth Amendment to the United States Constitution (ratified 1865).

The anti-slavery movement originated during the Age of Enlightenment, focused on ending the trans-Atlantic slave trade. In Colonial America, a few German Quakers issued the 1688 Germantown Quaker Petition Against Slavery, which marks the beginning of the American abolitionist movement. Before the Revolutionary War, evangelical colonists were the primary advocates for the opposition to slavery and the slave trade, doing so on humanitarian grounds. James Oglethorpe, the founder of the colony of Georgia, originally tried to prohibit slavery upon its founding, a decision that was eventually reversed.

During the Revolutionary era, all states abolished the international slave trade, but South Carolina reversed its decision. Between the Revolutionary War and 1804, laws, constitutions, or court decisions in each of the Northern states provided for the gradual or immediate abolition of slavery. No Southern state adopted similar policies. In 1807, Congress made the importation of slaves a crime, effective January 1, 1808, which was as soon as Article I, section 9 of the Constitution allowed. Immediate emancipation became a war goal for the Union in 1862 and was fully achieved in 1865.

History

Abolitionism in Colonial America

American abolitionism began very early, well before the United States was founded as a nation. An early law passed by Roger Williams and Samuel Gorton because it contradicted their Protestant beliefs abolished slavery (but not temporary indentured servitude) in Rhode Island in 1652; however, it floundered within 50 years, and Rhode Island became involved in the slave trade in 1700.

The first statement against slavery in Colonial America was written in 1688 by the Religious Society of Friends. On 18 February 1688, Francis Daniel Pastorius of Germantown, Pennsylvania, drafted the 1688 Germantown Quaker Petition Against Slavery, a two-page condemnation of slavery, and sent it to the governing bodies of their Quaker church. The intention of the document was to stop slavery within the Quaker community, where 70% of Quakers owned slaves between 1681 and 1705. It acknowledged the universal rights of all people. While the Quaker establishment did not take action at that time, the unusually early, clear, and forceful argument in the 1688 Germantown Quaker Petition Against Slavery initiated the spirit that finally led to the end of slavery in the Society of Friends (1776) and in the Commonwealth of Pennsylvania (1780). The Quaker Quarterly Meeting of Chester, Pennsylvania, made its first protest in 1711. Within a few decades the entire slave trade was under attack, being opposed by such Quaker leaders as William Burling, Benjamin Lay, Ralph Sandiford, William Southby, John Woolman, and Anthony Benezet.  Benezet was particularly influential, inspiring a later generation of notable anti-slavery activists, including Granville Sharp, John Wesley, Thomas Clarkson, Olaudah Equiano, Benjamin Franklin, Benjamin Rush, Absalom Jones, and Bishop Richard Allen, among others.

Samuel Sewall, a prominent Bostonian and one of the judges at the Salem Witch Trials, wrote The Selling of Joseph (1700) in protest of the widening practice of outright slavery as opposed to indentured servitude in the colonies. This is the earliest-recorded anti-slavery tract published in the future United States.

Slavery was banned in the colony of Georgia soon after its founding in 1733. The colony's founder, James Edward Oglethorpe, fended off repeated attempts by South Carolina merchants and land speculators to introduce slavery into the colony. In 1739, he wrote to the Georgia Trustees urging them to hold firm: 

The struggle between Georgia and South Carolina led to the first debates in Parliament over the issue of slavery, occurring between 1740 and 1742.

Rhode Island Quakers, associated with Moses Brown, were among the first in America to free slaves. Benjamin Rush was another leader, as were many Quakers. John Woolman gave up most of his business in 1756 to devote himself to campaigning against slavery along with other Quakers.

Between 1764 and 1774, seventeen enslaved African Americans appeared before the Massachusetts courts in freedom suits, spurred on the decision made in the Somerset v. Stewart case, which although not applying the colonies was still received positively by American abolitionists. Boston lawyer Benjamin Kent represented them. In 1766, Kent won a case (Slew v. Whipple) to liberate Jenny Slew, a mixed-race woman who had been kidnapped in Massachusetts and then handled as a slave.

According to historian Steven Pincus, many of the colonial legislatures worked to enact laws that would limit slavery. The Provincial legislature of Massachusetts Bay, as noted by historian Gary B. Nash, approved a law "prohibiting the importation and purchase of slaves by any Massachusetts citizen."  The Loyalist governor of Massachusetts, Thomas Hutchinson, vetoed the law, an action that prompted angered reaction from the general public. American abolitionists were cheered by the decision in Somerset v Stewart (1772), which prohibited slavery in the United Kingdom, though not in its colonies. In 1774, the influential Fairfax Resolves called for an end to the "wicked, cruel and unnatural" Atlantic slave trade.

Abolitionism during and after the Revolutionary War

One of the first articles advocating the emancipation of slaves and the abolition of slavery was written by Thomas Paine. Titled "African Slavery in America", it appeared on 8 March 1775 in the Postscript to the Pennsylvania Journal and Weekly Advertiser.

The Society for the Relief of Free Negroes Unlawfully Held in Bondage (Pennsylvania Abolition Society) was the first American abolition society, formed 14 April 1775, in Philadelphia, primarily by Quakers. The society suspended operations during the American Revolutionary War and was reorganized in 1784, with Benjamin Franklin as its first president.

In 1777, independent Vermont, not yet a state, became the first polity in North America to prohibit slavery: slaves were not directly freed, but masters were required to remove slaves from Vermont.

The Constitution included several provisions which accommodated slavery, although none used the word. Passed unanimously by the Congress of the Confederation in 1787, the Northwest Ordinance forbade slavery in the Northwest Territory, a vast area (the future Ohio, Indiana, Illinois, Michigan, and Wisconsin) in which slavery had been legal, but population was sparse.

The first state to begin a gradual abolition of slavery was Pennsylvania, in 1780. All importation of slaves was prohibited, but none were freed at first, only the slaves of masters who failed to register them with the state, along with the "future children" of enslaved mothers. Those enslaved in Pennsylvania before the 1780 law went into effect were not freed until 1847.

Massachusetts took a much more radical position. In 1780, during the Revolution, Massachusetts ratified its constitution and included within it a clause that declared all men equal. Based upon this clause, several freedom suits were filed by enslaved African Americans living in Massachusetts. In 1783, its Supreme Court, in the case of Commonwealth v. Nathaniel Jennison, reaffirmed the case of Brom and Bett v. Ashley, which held that even slaves were people that had a constitutional right to liberty. This gave freedom to slaves, effectively abolishing slavery.

States with a greater economic interest in slaves, such as New York and New Jersey, passed gradual emancipation laws. While some of these laws were gradual, these states enacted the first abolition laws in the entire "New World". In the State of New York, the enslaved population was transformed into indentured servants before being granted full emancipation in 1827. In other states, abolitionist legislation provided freedom only for the children of the enslaved. In New Jersey, slavery was not fully prohibited until the passage of the Thirteenth Amendment.

All of the other states north of Maryland began gradual abolition of slavery between 1781 and 1804, based on the Pennsylvania model and by 1804, all the Northern states had passed laws to gradually or immediately abolish it. Some slaves continued in involuntary, unpaid "indentured servitude" for two more decades, and others were moved south and sold to new owners in slave states.

Some individual slaveholders, particularly in the upper South, freed slaves, sometimes in their wills. Many noted they had been moved by the revolutionary ideals of the equality of men. The number of free blacks as a proportion of the black population in the upper South increased from less than 1 percent to nearly 10 percent between 1790 and 1810 as a result of these actions. Some slave owners, concerned about the increase in free blacks, which they viewed as destabilizing, freed slaves on condition that they emigrate to Africa.

All U.S. states abolished the transatlantic slave trade by 1790. South Carolina, which had abolished the slave trade in 1787, reversed that decision in 1803. In the American South, freedom suits were rejected by the courts, which held that the rights in the state constitutions did not apply to African Americans.

The federal government abolished the transatlantic slave trade in 1808, prohibited the slave trade in the District of Columbia in 1850, and made slavery unconstitutional altogether in 1865. This was a direct result of the Union victory in the American Civil War. The central issue of the war was slavery.

Motives
Historian James M. McPherson in 1964 defined an abolitionist "as one who before the Civil War had agitated for the immediate, unconditional and total abolition of slavery in the United States". He notes that many historians have used a broader definition without his emphasis on immediacy. Thus he does not include opponents of slavery such as Abraham Lincoln or the Republican Party; they called for the immediate end to expansion of slavery before 1861.

The religious component of American abolitionism was great. It began with the Quakers, then moved to the other Protestants with the Second Great Awakening of the early 19th century. Many leaders were ministers. Saying slavery was sinful made its evil easy to understand, and tended to arouse fervor for the cause. The debate about slavery was often based on what the Bible said or did not say about it. John Brown, who had studied the Bible for the ministry, proclaimed that he was "an instrument of God".

As such, abolitionism in the United States has been identified by historians as an expression of moralism, It often operated in tandem with another social reform effort, the temperance movement. Slavery was also attacked, to a lesser degree, as harmful on economic grounds. Evidence was that the South, with many enslaved African Americans on plantations, was definitely poorer than the North, which had few.

The South after 1804
The institution remained solid in the South, and that region's customs and social beliefs evolved into a strident defense of slavery in response to the rise of a stronger anti-slavery stance in the North. In 1835 alone, abolitionists mailed over a million pieces of anti-slavery literature to the South, giving rise to the gag rules in Congress, after the theft of mail from the Charleston, South Carolina, post office, and much back-and-forth about whether postmasters were required to deliver this mail.  According to the Postmaster General, they were not.

Under the Constitution, the importation of enslaved persons could not be prohibited until 1808 (20 years). As the end of the 20 years approached, an Act Prohibiting Importation of Slaves sailed through Congress with little opposition. President Jefferson supported it, and it went effect on January 1, 1808.

In 1820, the Act to Protect the Commerce of the United States and Punish the Crime of Piracy was passed. This law made importing slaves into the United States a death penalty offense. The Confederate States of America continued this prohibition with the sentence of death and prohibited the import of slaves.

Abolitionism's sudden emergence
In 1830 most Americans were, at least in principle, opposed to slavery. The problem was how to end it, and what would become of the slaves once they were free: "If the chain of slavery can be broken,... we may cherish the hope... that proper means will be devised for the disposal of the blacks, and that this foul and unnatural crime of holding men in bondage will finally be rooted out from our land.", as it was put in The Philanthropist. In the 1830s there was a progressive shift in thinking in the North. Mainstream opinion changed from gradual emancipation and resettlement of freed blacks in Africa, sometimes a condition of their manumission, to immediatism: freeing all the slaves immediately and sorting out the problems later. This change was in many cases sudden, a consequence of the individual's coming in direct contact with the horrors of American slavery, or hearing of them from a credible source. As it was put by Amos Adams Lawrence, who witnessed the capture and return to slavery of Anthony Burns, "we went to bed one night old-fashioned, conservative, Compromise Union Whigs and waked up stark mad Abolitionists."

Garrison and immediate emancipation

The American beginning of abolitionism as a political movement is usually dated from 1 January 1831, when Wm. Lloyd Garrison (as he always signed himself) published the first issue of his new weekly newspaper, The Liberator (1831), which appeared without interruption until slavery in the United States was abolished in 1865, when it closed.

Immediate abolition

Abolitionists included those who joined the American Anti-Slavery Society or its auxiliary groups in the 1830s and 1840s, as the movement fragmented. The fragmented anti-slavery movement included groups such as the Liberty Party; the American and Foreign Anti-Slavery Society; the American Missionary Association; and the Church Anti-Slavery Society. Historians traditionally distinguish between moderate anti-slavery reformers or gradualists, who concentrated on stopping the spread of slavery, and radical abolitionists or immediatists, whose demands for unconditional emancipation often merged with a concern for Black civil rights. However, James Stewart advocates a more nuanced understanding of the relationship of abolition and anti-slavery prior to the Civil War:

While instructive, the distinction [between anti-slavery and abolition] can also be misleading, especially in assessing abolitionism's political impact. For one thing, slaveholders never bothered with such fine points. Many immediate abolitionists showed no less concern than did other white Northerners about the fate of the nation's "precious legacies of freedom". Immediatism became most difficult to distinguish from broader anti-Southern opinions once ordinary citizens began articulating these intertwining beliefs.

Anti-slavery advocates were outraged by the murder on 7 November 1837 of Elijah Parish Lovejoy, a white man and editor of an abolitionist newspaper, by a pro-slavery mob in Illinois. This was soon followed by the destruction by arson, three days after it opened, of abolition's great new building, Pennsylvania Hall. Except for the burning of the U.S. Capitol and the White House by the British during the War of 1812, it was the worst case of arson in the country up to that date. Fire companies were prevented by violence from saving the building.

Nearly all Northern politicians, such as Abraham Lincoln, rejected the "immediate emancipation" called for by the abolitionists, seeing it as "extreme". Indeed, many Northern leaders, including Lincoln, Stephen Douglas (the Democratic nominee in 1860), John C. Frémont (the Republican nominee in 1856), and Ulysses S. Grant married into slave-owning Southern families without any moral qualms.

Anti-slavery as a principle was far more than just the wish to prevent the expansion of slavery. After 1840, abolitionists rejected this because it let sin continue to exist; they demanded that slavery end everywhere, immediately and completely. John Brown was the only abolitionist to have actually planned a violent insurrection, though David Walker promoted the idea. The abolitionist movement was strengthened by the activities of free African Americans, especially in the Black church, who argued that the old Biblical justifications for slavery contradicted the New Testament.

African-American activists and their writings were rarely heard outside the Black community. However, they were tremendously influential on a few sympathetic white people, most prominently the first white activist to reach prominence, Wm. Lloyd Garrison, who was its most effective propagandist. Garrison's efforts to recruit eloquent spokesmen led to the discovery of ex-slave Frederick Douglass, who eventually became a prominent activist in his own right. Eventually, Douglass would publish his own widely distributed abolitionist newspaper, North Star.

In the early 1850s, the American abolitionist movement split into two camps over the question of whether the United States Constitution did or did not protect slavery. This issue arose in the late 1840s after the publication of The Unconstitutionality of Slavery by Lysander Spooner. The Garrisonians, led by Garrison and Wendell Phillips, publicly burned copies of the Constitution, called it a pact with slavery, and demanded its abolition and replacement. Another camp, led by Lysander Spooner, Gerrit Smith, and eventually Douglass, considered the Constitution to be an anti-slavery document. Using an argument based upon Natural Law and a form of social contract theory, they said that slavery fell outside the Constitution's scope of legitimate authority and therefore should be abolished.

Another split in the abolitionist movement was along class lines. The artisan republicanism of Robert Dale Owen and Frances Wright stood in stark contrast to the politics of prominent elite abolitionists such as industrialist Arthur Tappan and his evangelist brother Lewis. While the former pair opposed slavery on a basis of solidarity of "wage slaves" with "chattel slaves", the Whiggish Tappans strongly rejected this view, opposing the characterization of Northern workers as "slaves" in any sense. (Lott, 129–130)

Many American abolitionists took an active role in opposing slavery by supporting the Underground Railroad. This was made illegal by the federal Fugitive Slave Law of 1850, arguably the most hated and most openly evaded federal legislation in the nation's history. Nevertheless, participants like Harriet Tubman, Henry Highland Garnet, Alexander Crummell, Amos Noë Freeman, and others continued with their work. Abolitionists were particularly active in Ohio, where some worked directly in the Underground Railroad. Since only the Ohio River separated free Ohio from slave Kentucky, it was a popular destination for fugitive slaves. Supporters helped them there, in many cases to cross Lake Erie by boat, into Canada. The Western Reserve area of northeast Ohio was "probably the most intensely antislavery section of the country." The Oberlin-Wellington Rescue got national publicity. Abolitionist John Brown grew up in Hudson, Ohio. In the South, members of the abolitionist movement or other people opposing slavery were often targets of lynch mob violence before the American Civil War.

Numerous known abolitionists lived, worked, and worshipped in downtown Brooklyn, from Henry Ward Beecher, who auctioned slaves into freedom from the pulpit of Plymouth Church, to Nathaniel Eggleston, a leader of the American and Foreign Anti-Slavery Society, who also preached at the Bridge Street African Methodist Episcopal Church, and lived on Duffield Street. His fellow Duffield Street residents Thomas and Harriet Truesdell were leading members of the abolitionist movement. Mr. Truesdell was a founding member of the Providence Anti-slavery Society before moving to Brooklyn in 1838. Harriet Truesdell was also very active in the movement, organizing an anti-slavery convention in Pennsylvania Hall (Philadelphia). Another prominent Brooklyn-based abolitionist was Rev. Joshua Leavitt, trained as a lawyer at Yale, who stopped practicing law in order to attend Yale Divinity School, and subsequently edited the abolitionist newspaper The Emancipator and campaigned against slavery, as well as advocating other social reforms. In 1841, Leavitt published The Financial Power of Slavery, which argued that the South was draining the national economy due to its reliance on enslaved workers. In 2007, Duffield Street was given the name Abolitionist Place, and the Truesdells' home at 227 Duffield received landmark status in 2021.

Abolitionism at colleges

Western Reserve College
Both Garrison's newspaper The Liberator and his book Thoughts on African Colonization (1832) arrived shortly after publication at Western Reserve College, in Hudson, Ohio, which was briefly the center of abolitionist discourse in the United States. (John Brown grew up in Hudson.) The readers, including college president Charles Backus Storrs, found Garrison's arguments and evidence convincing. Abolition versus colonization rapidly became the primary issue on the campus, to the point that Storrs complained in writing that nothing else was being discussed.

The college's chaplain and theology professor Beriah Green said that "his Thoughts and his paper (The Liberator) are worthy of the eye and the heart of every American." Green delivered in the college chapel in November and December 1832 four sermons supporting immediate abolition of slavery. These so offended the college's trustees, more conservative than either the students or the faculty, that Green resigned, expecting that he would be fired. Elizur Wright, another professor, resigned soon afterwards and became the first secretary of the American Anti-Slavery Society, of which Green was the first president. Storrs contracted tuberculosis, took a leave of absence, and died within six months. This left the school with only one of its four professors.

Oneida Institute for Science and Industry
Green was soon hired as the new president of the Oneida Institute. Under the previous president, George Washington Gale, there had been a mass walkout of students; among the issues was Gale's lack of support for abolition.

He accepted the position on conditions that 1) he be allowed to preach "immediatism", immediate emancipation, and 2) that African-American students be admitted on the same terms as white students. These were accepted, and we know the names of 16 Blacks who studied there. Native American students, of whom we know the names of two, were openly accepted as well.

Under Green, Oneida became "a hotbed of anti-slavery activity." It was "abolitionist to the core, more so than any other American college." For Presbyterian minister and Bible professor Green, slavery was not just an evil but a sin, and abolitionism was what Christ's principles mandated. Under him a cadre of abolitionists was trained, who then carried the abolitionist message, via lectures and sermons, throughout the North. 
Many future well-known black leaders and abolitionists were students at Oneida while Green was president. These include William Forten (son of James Forten), Alexander Crummell, Rev. Henry Highland Garnet and Rev. Amos Noë Freeman.

Lane Seminary

The Oneida Institute did not have an incident, like that of Western Reserve, which brought national attention to it. Its successor, Lane Seminary, in Cincinnati, did.

"Lane was Oneida moved west." Leading the exodus from Oneida was a former Oneida student, and private student of Gale before that, Theodore Dwight Weld. He greatly impressed the philanthropist brothers and abolitionists Arthur and Lewis Tappan. They hired him to report on the movement nationally, and specifically to find a new location for their funding, since Oneida, a manual labor school, was a disappointment, according to Weld and his student followers. (The manual labor school movement had students work about 3 hours a day on farms or in small factories or plants, such as Oneida's printing shop, and was intended to provide needy students with funds for their education – a form of work-study – while at the same time providing them the newly recognized physical and psychological (spiritual) benefits of exercise.)

At the same time that Weld was scouting a location for a new school, the barely-functioning Lane Seminary was looking for students. Based on Weld's recommendation, the Tappans started giving Lane the financial support they had previously given Oneida. Weld, though on paper enrolled as a student at Lane, was de facto its head, choosing, through his recommendations to the Tappans, the president (Lyman Beecher, after Charles Grandison Finney, who became later the second president of Oberlin, turned it down), and telling the trustees whom to hire.

The group of students led by Weld constituted the first student movement in the history of the country. He left Oneida, and they did. He chose Lane, and they followed him there. When he soon left Lane for another new, struggling institution, Oberlin, they did so too, as a group.

Students, many of whom considered him the real leader of Lane, responded to Weld's announcement of the new school in Cincinnati.

Lane ended up with about 100 students, the most of any seminary in America.

One of Weld's key contentions (and of Puritan abolition sentiment in general) was that slavery was inherently anti-family. While slave marriage was illegal, it happened frequently. Slave owners expected their slaves to have many children to replace their numbers; Virginia and Maryland "exported" slaves to the Deep South — they were an asset like cattle — after Congress had banned the importation of slaves in 1808. Since slaves were property they were frequently bought and sold, ripping apart families. In his 1839 book American Slavery As It Is, Weld showed just how brutal the slave trade was towards families. To the very family-focused Puritans, this was one of the greatest crimes of slavery. Weld's descriptions of families destroyed would later serve as the basis for scenes in Uncle Tom's Cabin, including Uncle Tom's being sold and separated from the children.

Lane Seminary debates
No sooner had this disparate group of former Oneida students and others arrived at Lane, under the leadership of Weld, than they formed an anti-slavery society. They then proceeded to hold a well-publicized series of debates on abolition versus African colonization, lasting 18 evenings, and decided that abolition was a much better solution to slavery. In fact no real debate took place, since no one appeared to defend colonization.

These "debates", which were well publicized, alarmed Lane's president Lyman Beecher and the school's trustees. Adding to their alarm were the classes the students were holding in the Black community, teaching Blacks to read. Fearing violence, since Cincinnati was strongly anti-abolitionist (see Cincinnati riots of 1829), they immediately prohibited any future such "off-the-topic" discussions and activities. The students, again led by Weld, felt that abolitionism was so important – it was their responsibility as Christians to promote it – and they resigned en masse, joined by Asa Mahan, a trustee who supported the students. With support from the Tappans, they briefly tried to establish a new seminary, but as this did not prove a practical solution they accepted a proposal that they move as a group to the new Oberlin Collegiate Institute.

Oberlin Collegiate Institute
Due to its students' anti-slavery position, Oberlin soon became one of the most liberal colleges and accepted African-American students. Along with Garrison, Northcutt and Collins were proponents of immediate abolition. Abby Kelley Foster became an "ultra abolitionist" and a follower of William Lloyd Garrison. She led Susan B. Anthony as well as Elizabeth Cady Stanton into the anti-slavery cause.

After 1840, "abolition" usually referred to positions similar to Garrison's. It was largely an ideological movement led by about 3,000 people, including free blacks and free people of color, many of whom, such as Frederick Douglass in Rochester, New York, and Robert Purvis and James Forten in Philadelphia, played prominent leadership roles. Douglass became legally free during a two-year stay in England, as British supporters raised funds to purchase his freedom from his American owner Thomas Auld, and also helped fund his abolitionist newspapers in the United States. Abolitionism had a strong religious base including Quakers, and people converted by the revivalist fervor of the Second Great Awakening, led by Charles Finney in the North, in the 1830s. Belief in abolition contributed to the breaking away of some small denominations, such as the Free Methodist Church.

Evangelical abolitionists founded some colleges, most notably Bates College in Maine and Oberlin College in Ohio. The movement attracted such figures as Yale president Noah Porter and Harvard president Thomas Hill.

In the North, most opponents of slavery supported other modernizing reform movements such as the temperance movement, public schooling, and prison- and asylum-building. They were split on the issue of women's activism and their political role, and this contributed to a major rift in the Society. In 1839, brothers Arthur Tappan and Lewis Tappan left the Society and formed the American and Foreign Anti-Slavery Society, which did not admit women. Other members of the Society, including Charles Turner Torrey, Amos Phelps, Henry Stanton, and Alanson St. Clair, in addition to disagreeing with Garrison on the women's issue, urged taking a much more activist approach to abolitionism and consequently challenged Garrison's leadership at the Society's annual meeting in January 1839. When the challenge was beaten back, they left and founded the New Organization, which adopted a more activist approach to freeing slaves. Soon after, in 1840, they formed the Liberty Party, which had as its sole platform the abolition of slavery. By the end of 1840, Garrison himself announced the formation of a third new organization, the Friends of Universal Reform, with sponsors and founding members including prominent reformers Maria Chapman, Abby Kelley Foster, Oliver Johnson, and Bronson Alcott (father of Louisa May Alcott).

Abolitionists such as William Lloyd Garrison repeatedly condemned slavery for contradicting the principles of freedom and equality on which the country was founded. In 1854, Garrison wrote:
I am a believer in that portion of the Declaration of American Independence in which it is set forth, as among self-evident truths, "that all men are created equal; that they are endowed by their Creator with certain inalienable rights; that among these are life, liberty, and the pursuit of happiness." Hence, I am an abolitionist. Hence, I cannot but regard oppression in every form – and most of all, that which turns a man into a thing – with indignation and abhorrence. Not to cherish these feelings would be recreancy to principle. They who desire me to be dumb on the subject of slavery, unless I will open my mouth in its defense, ask me to give the lie to my professions, to degrade my manhood, and to stain my soul. I will not be a liar, a poltroon, or a hypocrite, to accommodate any party, to gratify any sect, to escape any odium or peril, to save any interest, to preserve any institution, or to promote any object. Convince me that one man may rightfully make another man his slave, and I will no longer subscribe to the Declaration of Independence. Convince me that liberty is not the inalienable birthright of every human being, of whatever complexion or clime, and I will give that instrument to the consuming fire. I do not know how to espouse freedom and slavery together.

Uncle Tom's Cabin

The most influential abolitionist publication was Uncle Tom's Cabin (1852), the best-selling novel by Harriet Beecher Stowe, who had attended the anti-slavery debates at Lane, of which her father, Lyman Beecher, was the president. Outraged by the Fugitive Slave Law of 1850 (which made the escape narrative part of everyday news), Stowe emphasized the horrors that abolitionists had long claimed about slavery. Her depiction of the evil slave owner Simon Legree, a transplanted Yankee who kills the Christ-like Uncle Tom, outraged the North, helped sway British public opinion against the South, and inflamed Southern slave owners who tried to refute it by showing that some slave owners were humanitarian. It inspired numerous anti-Tom, pro-slavery novels, several written and published by women.

The Constitution and ending slavery

The Republican strategy of using the Constitution

Two diametrically opposed anti-slavery positions emerged regarding the United States Constitution. The Garrisonians emphasized that the document permitted and protected slavery, and was therefore "an agreement with hell" that had to be rejected in favor of immediate emancipation. The mainstream anti-slavery position adopted by the new Republican party argued that the Constitution could and should be used to eventually end slavery. They assumed that the Constitution gave the government no authority to abolish slavery directly. However, there were multiple tactics available to support the long-term strategy of using the Constitution as a battering ram against the peculiar institution. First Congress could block the admission of any new slave states. That would steadily move the balance of power in Congress and the electoral college in favor of freedom. Congress could abolish slavery in the District of Columbia and the territories. Congress could use the Commerce Clause to end the interstate slave trade, thereby crippling the steady movement of slavery from the southeast to the southwest. Congress could recognize free blacks as full citizens and insist on due process rights to protect fugitive slaves from being captured and returned to bondage. Finally the government could use patronage powers to promote the anti-slavery cause across the country, especially in the border states. Pro-slavery elements considered the Republican strategy to be much more dangerous to their cause than radical abolitionism. Lincoln's election was met by secession. Indeed, the Republican strategy mapped the "crooked path to abolition" that prevailed during the Civil War.

Events leading to emancipation
In the 1850s, the slave trade remained legal in all 16 states of the American South.  While slavery was fading away in the cities and border states, it remained strong in plantation areas that grew cash crops such as cotton, sugar, rice, tobacco or hemp. By the 1860 United States Census, the slave population in the United States had grown to four million. American abolitionism, after Nat Turner's revolt ended its discussion in the South, was based in the North, and white Southerners alleged it fostered slave rebellion.

The white abolitionist movement in the North was led by social reformers, especially William Lloyd Garrison, founder of the American Anti-Slavery Society, and writers such as John Greenleaf Whittier and Harriet Beecher Stowe. Black activists included former slaves such as Frederick Douglass, and free blacks such as the brothers Charles Henry Langston and John Mercer Langston, who helped to found the Ohio Anti-Slavery Society.
 
Some abolitionists said that slavery was criminal and a sin; they also criticized slave owners for using black women as concubines and taking sexual advantage of them.

Compromise of 1850

The Compromise of 1850 attempted to resolve issues surrounding slavery caused by the War with Mexico and the admission to the Union of the slave Republic of Texas. The Compromise of 1850 was proposed by "The Great Compromiser" Henry Clay; support was coordinated by Senator Stephen A. Douglas. Through the compromise, California was admitted as a free state after its state convention unanimously opposed slavery there, Texas was financially compensated for the loss of its territories northwest of the modern state borders, and the slave trade (not slavery) was abolished in the District of Columbia. The Fugitive Slave Law was a concession to the South. Abolitionists were outraged, because the new law required Northerners to help in the capture and return of runaway slaves.

Republican Party

In 1854, Congress passed the Kansas–Nebraska Act, which opened those territories to slavery if the local residents voted that way. The anti-slavery gains made in previous compromises were reversed. A firestorm of outrage brought together former Whigs, Know-Nothings, and former Free Soil Democrats to form a new party in 1854–56, the Republican Party. It included a program of rapid modernization involving the government promotion of industry, railroads, banks, free homesteads, and colleges, all to the annoyance of the South. The new party denounced the Slave Power – that is the political power of the slave owners who supposedly controlled the national government for their own benefit and to the disadvantage of the ordinary white man.

The Republicans wanted to achieve the gradual extinction of slavery by market forces, because its members believed that free labor was superior to slave labor. Southern leaders said the Republican policy of blocking the expansion of slavery into the West made them second-class citizens, and challenged their autonomy. With the 1860 presidential victory of Abraham Lincoln, seven Deep South states whose economy was based on cotton and slavery decided to secede and form a new nation. The American Civil War broke out in April 1861 with the firing on Fort Sumter in South Carolina. When Lincoln called for troops to suppress the rebellion, four more slave states seceded.

Explorer and abolitionist John C. Frémont ran as the first Republican nominee for president in 1856. The new party crusaded on the slogan: "Free soil, free silver, free men, Frémont and victory!" Although he lost, the party showed a strong base. It dominated in Yankee areas of New England, New York and the northern Midwest, and had a strong presence in the rest of the North. It had almost no support in the South, where it was roundly denounced in 1856–60 as a divisive force that threatened civil war.

Without using the term "containment", the new Party in the mid-1850s proposed a system of containing slavery, once it gained control of the national government. Historian James Oakes explains the strategy:
The federal government would surround the south with free states, free territories, and free waters, building what they called a "cordon of freedom" around slavery, hemming it in until the system's own internal weaknesses forced the slave states one by one to abandon slavery.

Abolitionists demanded immediate emancipation, not a slow-acting containment. They rejected the new party, and in turn its leaders reassured voters they were not trying to abolish slavery in the U.S. altogether, which was politically impossible, and were just working against its spread.

John Brown's raid on Harpers Ferry

John Brown has been called "the most controversial of all 19th-century Americans". When Brown was hanged after his attempt to start a slave rebellion in 1859, church bells rang across the North, there was a 100-gun salute in Albany, New York, large memorial meetings took place throughout the North, and famous writers such as Ralph Waldo Emerson and Henry David Thoreau joined other Northerners in praising Brown. Whereas Garrison was a pacifist, Brown believed violence was unfortunately necessary to end slavery.

The raid, though unsuccessful in the short term, may have helped Lincoln get elected and moved the Southern states to secede, leading to the Civil War. Some historians regard Brown as a crazed lunatic, while David S. Reynolds hails him as the man who "killed slavery, sparked the civil war, and seeded civil rights".

His raid in October 1859 involved a band of 22 men who seized the Federal armory at Harper's Ferry, Virginia (since 1863, West Virginia), knowing it contained tens of thousands of weapons. Brown believed the South was on the verge of a gigantic slave uprising and that one spark would set it off. Brown's supporters George Luther Stearns, Franklin B. Sanborn, Thomas Wentworth Higginson, Theodore Parker, Samuel Gridley Howe, and Gerrit Smith were all abolitionists, members of the so-called Secret Six who provided financial backing for Brown's raid. Brown's raid, says historian David Potter, "was meant to be of vast magnitude and to produce a revolutionary slave uprising throughout the South".

The raid did not go as expected. Brown hoped to have quickly a small army of runaway slaves, but made no provision to inform these potential runaways, although he got a little local support. Lt. Colonel Robert E. Lee of the U.S. Army was dispatched to put down the raid, and Brown was quickly captured. He was tried for treason against the Commonwealth of Virginia, murder, and inciting a slave revolt, was found guilty of all charges, and was hanged. At his trial, Brown exuded a remarkable zeal and single-mindedness that played directly to Southerners' worst fears. Under Virginia law there was a month between the sentencing and the hanging, and in those weeks Brown spoke gladly with reporters and anyone else who wanted to see him, and wrote many letters. Few individuals did more to cause secession than John Brown, because Southerners believed he was right about an impending slave revolt. The day of his execution, Brown prophesied, "the crimes of this guilty land will never be purged away but with blood. I had as I now think vainly flattered myself that without very much bloodshed it might be done."

American Civil War

The American Civil War began with the stated goal of preserving the Union, and Lincoln said repeatedly that on the topic of slavery, he was only opposed to its spread to the Western territories. This view of the war progressively changed, one step at a time, as public sentiment evolved, until by 1865 the war was seen in the North as primarily concerned with ending slavery. The first federal act taken against slavery during the war occurred on 16 April 1862, when Lincoln signed the District of Columbia Compensated Emancipation Act, which abolished slavery in Washington, D.C. A few months later, on June 19, Congress banned slavery in all federal territories, fulfilling Lincoln's 1860 campaign promise. Meanwhile, the Union suddenly found itself dealing with a steady stream of thousands of escaped slaves, achieving freedom, or so they hoped, by crossing Union lines. In response, Congress passed the Confiscation Acts, which essentially declared escaped slaves from the South to be confiscated war property, and thus did not have to be returned to their Confederate owners. Although the initial act did not mention emancipation, the Second Confiscation Act, enacted on 17 July 1862, stated that escaped or liberated slaves belonging to anyone who participated in or supported the rebellion "shall be deemed captives of war, and shall be forever free of their servitude, and not again held as slaves." Pro-Union forces gained control of the border states of Maryland, Missouri, and West Virginia; all three states would abolish slavery before the end of the war. Lincoln issued the Emancipation Proclamation, effective 1 January 1863, which declared only those slaves in Confederate states to be free. The United States Colored Troops began operations in 1863. The Fugitive Slave Act of 1850 was repealed in June 1864. Eventually support for abolition was enough to pass the Thirteenth Amendment, ratified in December 1865, which abolished slavery everywhere in the United States, freeing more than 50,000 people still enslaved in Kentucky and Delaware, in 1865 the only states in which slavery still existed. The Thirteenth Amendment also abolished slavery among the Native American tribes.

Variations by area

Abolition in the North

The abolitionist movement began about the time of the United States' independence. Quakers played a big role. The first abolition organization was the Pennsylvania Abolition Society, which first met in 1775; Benjamin Franklin was its president. The New York Manumission Society was founded in 1785 by powerful politicians: John Jay, Alexander Hamilton, and Aaron Burr.

There is quite a bit of confusion about the dates in which slavery was abolished in the Northern states, because "abolishing slavery" meant different things in different states. (Theodore Weld, in his pamphlet opposing slavery in the District of Columbia, gives a detailed chronology.) It is true that beginning with the independent Republic of Vermont in 1777, all states north of the Ohio River and the Mason–Dixon line that separated Pennsylvania from Maryland passed laws that abolished slavery, although in some cases this did not apply to existing slaves, only their future offspring. These included the first abolition laws in the entire New World: the Massachusetts Constitution, adopted in 1780, declared all men to have rights, making slavery unenforceable, and it disappeared through the individual actions of both masters and slaves. 

However, what the abolition forces passed in 1799 in New York State was an Act for the gradual abolition of slavery. Slavery in New York did not officially end until 1827, and more than 70 enslaved people in New York appeared on the 1830 decennial census. No slaves appeared in the state's 1840 census. New Jersey abolished slavery in 1804, but in 1860 a dozen black people were still held as "perpetual apprentices".

In the Northwest Ordinance of 1787, the Congress of the Confederation prohibited slavery in the territories northwest of the Ohio River.

At the Constitutional Convention of 1787, slavery was the most contentious topic. Outright prohibition of slavery was impossible, because the Southern states (Georgia, South Carolina, North Carolina, Virginia, Maryland, and Delaware) would never have agreed to it. The only restriction on slavery that was agreed to was to allow Congress to prohibit the importation of slaves, and even that was postponed for 20 years. By that time, all the states except South Carolina had laws abolishing or severely limiting the importation of slaves. When 1808 approached, then-President Thomas Jefferson, in his 1806 annual message to Congress (State of the Union), proposed legislation, approved by Congress with little controversy in 1807, prohibiting the importation of slaves into the United States effective the first day the Constitution permitted, 1 January 1808. As he put it, this would "withdraw the citizens of the United States from all further participation in those violations of human rights...which the morality, the reputation, and the best of our country have long been eager to proscribe". However, about 1,000 slaves per year continued to be illegally brought (smuggled) into the United States; see Wanderer and Clotilda. This was primarily via Spanish Florida and the Gulf Coast; the United States acquired Florida from Spain in 1819, effective 1821, in part as a slave-control measure: no imports coming in, and certainly no fugitives escaping into a refuge.

Congress declined to pass any restriction on the lucrative interstate slave trade, which expanded to replace the supply of African slaves (see Slavery in the United States#Slave trade).

Manumission by Southern owners
After 1776, Quaker and Moravian advocates helped persuade numerous slaveholders in the Upper South to free their slaves. Manumissions increased for nearly two decades. Many individual acts by slaveholders freed thousands of slaves. Slaveholders freed slaves in such numbers that the percentage of free black people in the Upper South increased from 1 to 10 percent, with most of that increase in Virginia, Maryland and Delaware. By 1810 three-quarters of blacks in Delaware were free. The most notable of men offering freedom was Robert Carter III of Virginia, who freed more than 450 people by "Deed of Gift", filed in 1791. This number was more slaves than any single American had freed before or after. Often slaveholders came to their decisions by their own struggles in the Revolution; their wills and deeds frequently cited language about the equality of men supporting the decision to set slaves free. The era's changing economy also encouraged slaveholders to release slaves. Planters were shifting from labor-intensive tobacco to mixed-crop cultivation and needed fewer slaves.

Together with African Americans freed before the Revolution, the newly free black families began to thrive. By 1860, 91.7% of the blacks in Delaware and 49.7% of the those in Maryland were free. Such early free families often formed the core of artisans, professionals, preachers, and teachers in future generations.

Western territories

During Congressional debate in 1820 on the proposed Tallmadge Amendment, which sought to limit slavery in Missouri as it became a state, Rufus King declared that "laws or compacts imposing any such condition [slavery] upon any human being are absolutely void, because contrary to the law of nature, which is the law of God, by which he makes his ways known to man, and is paramount to all human control". The amendment failed and Missouri became a slave state. According to historian David Brion Davis, this may have been the first time in the world that a political leader openly attacked slavery's perceived legality in such a radical manner.

Beginning in the 1830s, the U.S. Postmaster General refused to allow the mails to carry abolition pamphlets to the South. Northern teachers suspected of abolitionism were expelled from the South, and abolitionist literature was banned. One Northerner, Amos Dresser (1812–1904), in 1835 was tried in Nashville, Tennessee, for possessing anti-slavery publications, convicted, and as punishment was whipped publicly. Southerners rejected the denials of Republicans that they were abolitionists. They pointed to John Brown's attempt in 1859 to start a slave uprising as proof that multiple Northern conspiracies were afoot to ignite slave rebellions. Although some abolitionists did call for slave revolts, no evidence of any other Brown-like conspiracy has been discovered. The North felt threatened as well, for as Eric Foner concludes, "Northerners came to view slavery as the very antithesis of the good society, as well as a threat to their own fundamental values and interests". The famous, "fiery" abolitionist Abby Kelley Foster, from Massachusetts, was considered an "ultra" abolitionist who believed in full civil rights for all black people. She held to the view that the freed slaves would colonize Liberia. Parts of the anti-slavery movement became known as "Abby Kellyism". She recruited Susan B Anthony and Lucy Stone to the movement. Effingham Capron, a cotton and textile scion, who attended the Quaker meeting where Abby Kelley Foster and her family were members, became a prominent abolitionist at the local, state, and national levels. The local anti-slavery society at Uxbridge, Massachusetts, had more than 25% of the town's population as members.

Abolitionist viewpoints

Religion and morality
The Second Great Awakening of the 1820s and 1830s in religion inspired groups that undertook many types of social reform. For some that included the immediate abolition of slavery as they considered it sinful to hold slaves as well as to tolerate slavery.  Opposition to slavery, for example, was one of the works of piety of the Methodist Churches, which were established by John Wesley. "Abolitionist" had several meanings at the time. The followers of William Lloyd Garrison, including Wendell Phillips and Frederick Douglass, demanded the "immediate abolition of slavery", hence the name, also called "immediatism". A more pragmatic group of abolitionists, such as Theodore Weld and Arthur Tappan, wanted immediate action, but were willing to support a program of gradual emancipation, with a long intermediate stage.

"Anti-slavery men", such as John Quincy Adams, did not call slavery a sin. They called it an evil feature of society as a whole. They did what they could to limit slavery and end it where possible, but were not part of any abolitionist group. For example, in 1841, John Quincy Adams represented the Amistad African slaves in the Supreme Court of the United States and argued that they should be set free. In the last years before the war, "anti-slavery" could refer to the Northern majority, such as Abraham Lincoln, who opposed expansion of slavery or its influence, as by the Kansas–Nebraska Act or the Fugitive Slave Act. Many Southerners called all these abolitionists, without distinguishing them from the Garrisonians.

Historian James Stewart (1976) explains the abolitionists' deep beliefs: "All people were equal in God's sight; the souls of black folks were as valuable as those of whites; for one of God's children to enslave another was a violation of the Higher Law, even if it was sanctioned by the Constitution."

Irish Catholics in the United States seldom challenged the role of slavery in society as it was protected at that time by the U.S. Constitution. They viewed the abolitionists as anti-Catholic and anti-Irish. Irish Catholics were generally well received by Democrats in the South.

In contrast, most Irish Nationalists and Fenians supported the abolition of slavery. Daniel O'Connell, the Catholic leader of the Irish in Ireland, supported abolition in the United States. He organized a petition in Ireland with 60,000 signatures urging the Irish of the United States to support abolition. John O'Mahony, a founder of the Irish Republican Brotherhood was an abolitionist and served as colonel in the 69th Infantry Regiment during the Civil War.

The Irish Catholics in the United States were recent immigrants; most were poor and very few owned slaves. They had to compete with free blacks for unskilled labor jobs. They saw abolitionism as the militant wing of evangelical anti-Catholic Protestantism.

The Catholic Church in the United States had long ties in slaveholding Maryland and Louisiana. Despite a firm stand for the spiritual equality of black people, and the resounding condemnation of slavery by Pope Gregory XVI in his bull In supremo apostolatus issued in 1839, the American church continued in deeds, if not in public discourse, to avoid confrontation with slave-holding interests. In 1861, the Archbishop of New York wrote to Secretary of War Cameron: "That the Church is opposed to slavery ... Her doctrine on that subject is, that it is a crime to reduce men naturally free to a condition of servitude and bondage, as slaves."  No American bishop supported extra-political abolition or interference with states' rights before the Civil War.

The secular Germans of the Forty-Eighter immigration were largely anti-slavery. Prominent Forty-Eighters included Carl Schurz and Friedrich Hecker. German Lutherans seldom took a position on slavery, but German Methodists were anti-slavery.

Black abolitionist rhetoric
Historians and scholars have largely overlooked the work of black abolitionists; instead, they have focused on only a few black abolitionists, such as Frederick Douglass. Yet lesser-known black abolitionists, such as Martin Delany and James Monroe Whitfield, also played an undeniably large role in shaping the movement. Black abolitionists had the distinct problem of having to confront an often-hostile American public, while still acknowledging their nationality and struggle. As a result, many black abolitionists "intentionally adopted aspects of British, New England, and Midwestern cultures". Furthermore, much of abolitionist rhetoric, and black abolitionist rhetoric in particular, were influenced by the Puritan preaching heritage.

Abolitionist women

William Lloyd Garrison's abolitionist newsletter the Liberator noted in 1847, "the Anti-Slavery cause cannot stop to estimate where the greatest indebtedness lies, but whenever the account is made up there can be no doubt that the efforts and sacrifices of the WOMEN, who helped it, will hold a most honorable and conspicuous position." As the Liberator states, women played a crucial role as leaders in the anti-slavery movement.

Angelina and Sarah Grimké were the first female anti-slavery agents, and played a variety of roles in the abolitionist movement. Though born in the South, the Grimké sisters became disillusioned with slavery and moved North to get away from it. Perhaps because of their birthplace, the Grimké sisters' critiques carried particular weight and specificity. Angelina Grimké spoke of her thrill at seeing white men do manual labor of any kind. Their perspectives as native Southerners as well as women, brought a new important point of view to the abolitionist movement. In 1836, they moved to New York and began work for the Anti-Slavery Society, where they met and were impressed by William Lloyd Garrison. The sisters wrote many pamphlets (Angelina's "Appeal to the Christian Women of the South" was the only appeal directly to Southern women to defy slavery laws) and played leadership roles at the first Anti-Slavery Convention of American Women in 1837. The Grimkés later made a notable speaking tour around the north, which culminated in Angelina's February 1838 address to a Committee of the Legislature of Massachusetts.

Lucretia Mott was also active in the abolitionist movement. Though well known for her women's suffrage advocacy, Mott also played an important role in the abolitionist movement. During four decades, she delivered sermons about abolitionism, women's rights, and a host of other issues. Mott acknowledged her Quaker beliefs' determinative role in affecting her abolitionist sentiment. She spoke of the "duty (that) was impressed upon me at the time I consecrated myself to that Gospel which anoints 'to preach deliverance to the captive, to set at liberty them that are bruised ..." Mott's advocacy took a variety of forms: she worked with the Free Produce Society to boycott slave-made goods, volunteered with the Philadelphia Female Anti-Slavery Convention of American Women, and helped slaves escape to free territory.

Abby Kelley Foster, with a strong Quaker heritage, helped lead Susan B. Anthony and Lucy Stone into the abolition movement, and encouraged them to take on a role in political activism. She helped organize and was a key speaker at the first National Women's Rights Convention, held in Worcester, Massachusetts, in 1850. (The better-known Seneca Falls Convention, held in 1848, was not national). She was an "ultra" abolitionist who believed in immediate and complete civil rights for all slaves. Since 1841, however, she had resigned from the Quakers over disputes about not allowing anti-slavery speakers in meeting houses (including the Uxbridge monthly meeting where she had attended with her family), and the group disowned her. Abby Kelley became a leading speaker and the leading fundraiser for the American Anti-slavery Society. Radical abolitionism became known as "Abby Kelleyism".

Other leaders in the abolitionist movement were Lydia Maria Child, Elizabeth Cady Stanton, Susan B. Anthony, Harriet Tubman, and Sojourner Truth. But even beyond these well-known women, abolitionism maintained impressive support from white middle-class and some black women. It was these women who performed many of the logistical, day-to-day tasks that made the movement successful. They raised money, wrote and distributed propaganda pieces, drafted and signed petitions, and lobbied the legislatures. Though abolitionism sowed the seeds of the women's rights movement, most women became involved in abolitionism because of a gendered religious worldview, and the idea that they had feminine, moral responsibilities. For example, in the winter of 1831–1832, women sent three petitions to the Virginia legislature, advocating emancipation of the state's slave population. The only precedent for such action was Catharine Beecher's organization of a petition protesting the Cherokee removal. The Virginia petitions, while the first of their kind, were by no means the last. Similar backing increased leading up to the Civil War.

Even as women played crucial roles in abolitionism, the movement simultaneously helped stimulate women's-rights efforts. A full 10 years before the Seneca Falls Convention, the Grimké sisters were travelling and lecturing about their experiences with slavery. As Gerda Lerner says, the Grimkés understood their actions' great impact. "In working for the liberation of the slave," Lerner writes, "Sarah and Angelina Grimké found the key to their own liberation. And the consciousness of the significance of their actions was clearly before them. 'We Abolition Women are turning the world upside down.

Women gained important experiences in public speaking and organizing that stood them in good stead going forward. The Grimké sisters' public speaking played a critical part in legitimizing women's place in the public sphere. Some Christian women created cent societies to benefit abolition movements, where many women in a church would each pledge to donate one cent a week to help abolitionist causes.

The July 1848 Seneca Falls Convention grew out of a partnership between Lucretia Mott and Elizabeth Cady Stanton that blossomed while the two worked, at first, on abolitionist issues. Indeed, the two met at the World's Anti-Slavery Convention in the summer of 1840. Mott brought oratorical skills and an impressive reputation as an abolitionist to the nascent women's rights movement.

Abolitionism brought together active women and enabled them to make political and personal connections while honing communication and organizational skills. Even Sojourner Truth, commonly associated with abolitionism, delivered her first documented public speech at the 1850 National Women's Rights Convention in Worcester. There, she argued for women's reform activism.

Anti-abolitionist viewpoints

Anti-abolitionism in the North
It is easy to overstate the support for abolitionism in the North. "From Maine to Missouri, from the Atlantic to the Gulf, crowds gathered to hear mayors and aldermen, bankers and lawyers, ministers and priests denounce the abolitionists as amalgamationists, dupes, fanatics, foreign agents, and incendiaries." The whole abolitionist movement, the cadre of anti-slavery lecturers, was primarily focused on the North: convincing Northerners that slavery should be immediately abolished, and freed slaves given rights.

A majority of white Southerners, though by no means all, supported slavery; there was a growing feeling in favor of emancipation in North Carolina, Maryland, Virginia, and Kentucky, until the panic resulting from Nat Turner's 1831 revolt put an end to it. But only a minority in the North supported abolition, seen as an extreme, "radical" measure. (See Radical Republicans.) Horace Greeley remarked in 1854 that he had "never been able to discover any strong, pervading, over-ruling Anti Slavery sentiment in the Free States." Free blacks were subject in the North as well as in the South to conditions almost inconceivable today (2019).
Although the picture is neither uniform nor static, in general free blacks in the North were not citizens and could neither vote nor hold public office. They could not give testimony in court and their word was never taken against a white man's word, as a result of which white crimes against blacks were rarely punished. Black children could not study in the public schools, even though Black taxpayers helped support them, and there were only a handful of schools for Black students, like the African Free School in New York, the Abiel Smith School in Boston, and the Watkins Academy for Negro Youth in Baltimore. When schools for negroes were set up in Ohio in the 1830s, the teacher of one slept in it every night "for fear whites would burn it", and at another, "a vigilance committee threatened to tar and feather [the teacher] and ride her on a rail if she did not leave". "Black education was a dangerous pursuit for teachers."

Most colleges would not admit blacks. (Oberlin Collegiate Institute was the first college that survived to admit them by policy; the Oneida Institute was a short-lived predecessor.) In wages, housing, access to services, and transportation, separate but equal or Jim Crow treatment would have been a great improvement. The proposal to create the country's first college for negros, in New Haven, Connecticut, got such strong local opposition (New Haven Excitement) that it was quickly abandoned. Schools in which blacks and whites studied together in Canaan, New Hampshire, and Canterbury, Connecticut, were physically destroyed by mobs.

Southern actions against white abolitionists took legal channels: Amos Dresser was tried, convicted, and publicly whipped in Knoxville, and Reuben Crandall, Prudence Crandall's younger brother, was arrested in Washington D.C., and was found innocent, although he died soon of tuberculosis he contracted in jail. (The prosecutor was Francis Scott Key.) In Savannah, Georgia, the mayor and alderman protected an abolitionist visitor from a mob.

In the North there was far more serious violence by mobs, what the press sometimes called "mobocracy". In 1837 Rev. Elijah P. Lovejoy, who published an abolitionist newspaper, was killed by a mob in Illinois. Only six months later, the large, modern, and expensive new hall which the Pennsylvania Anti-Slavery Society built in Philadelphia in 1838, was burned by a mob three days after it opened. There were other anti-abolitionist riots in New York (1834), Cincinnati (1829, 1836, and 1841), Norwich, Connecticut (1834), Washington, D.C. (1835), Philadelphia (1842), and Granville, Ohio (following the Ohio State Anti-Slavery Convention, 1836), although there was also a pro-abolition riot (more precisely a pro-fugitive slave riot) in Boston in 1836 (and see Jerry Rescue). Between 1835 and 1838, anti-abolitionist violence "settled into a routine feature of public life in virtually all the major northern cities".

Giving to blacks the same rights that whites had, as Garrison called for, was "far outside the mainstream of opinion in the 1830s." Some opposed even allowing blacks to join abolitionist organizations. The one time that Garrison defended Southern slave-owners was when he compared them with anti-abolitionist Northerners:

Alexis de Tocqueville, in Democracy in America said:

Similarly, Harriet Beecher Stowe stated that "The bitterness of Southern slaveholders was tempered by many considerations of kindness for servants born in their houses, or upon their estates; but the Northern slaveholder traded in men and women whom he never saw, and of whose separations, tears, and miseries he determined never to hear."

The pro-slavery reaction to abolitionism

Slave owners were angry over the attacks on what some Southerners (including the politician John C. Calhoun) referred to as their "peculiar institution" of slavery. Starting in the 1830s, Southerners developed a vehement and growing ideological defense of slavery. Slave owners claimed that slavery was not a necessary evil, or an evil of any sort; slavery was a positive good for masters and slaves alike, and it was explicitly sanctioned by God. Biblical arguments were made in defense of slavery by religious leaders such as the Rev. Fred A. Ross and political leaders such as Jefferson Davis. Southern Biblical interpretations contradicted those of the abolitionists; a popular one was that the curse on Noah's son Ham and his descendants in Africa justified enslaving blacks. Abolitionists responded, denying that either God or the Bible endorses slavery, at least as practiced in the Antebellum South.

Colonization and the founding of Liberia

In the early 19th century, a variety of organizations were established that advocated relocation of black people from the United States, most prominently the American Colonization Society (ACS), founded in 1816. The ACS enjoyed the support of prominent Southern leaders such as Henry Clay and James Monroe who saw it as a convenient means of relocating free blacks whom they perceived as a threat to their control over enslaved blacks. Starting in the 1820s, the ACS and affiliated state societies assisted a few thousand free blacks to move to the newly established colonies in West Africa that were to form the Republic of Liberia. From 1832 onward most of the migrants were enslaved people who had been freed on the condition that they go to Liberia. Many migrants died of local diseases, but enough survived for Liberia to declare independence in 1847. The Americo-Liberians formed a ruling elite whose treatment of the native population followed the lines of disdain for African culture they had acquired in America.

Most African Americans opposed colonization, and simply wanted to be given the rights of free citizens in the United States. One notable opponent of such plans was the wealthy free black abolitionist James Forten of Philadelphia.

In 1832, prominent white abolitionist William Lloyd Garrison published his book Thoughts on African Colonization, in which he attacked severely the policy of sending blacks to (not "back to") Africa, and specifically the American Colonization Society. The Colonization Society, which he had previously supported, is "a creature without heart, without brains, eyeless, unnatural, hypocritical, relentless and unjust." "Colonization", according to Garrison, was not a plan to eliminate slavery, but to protect it. As it was put by a Garrison supporter:

Garrison also pointed out that a majority of the colonists died of disease, and the number of free blacks actually resettled in the future Liberia was minute in comparison to the number of slaves in the United States. As put by the same supporter:

See also

 Abolitionism in Boston, Massachusetts
 Abolitionism in New Bedford, Massachusetts
 Abolitionism in France
 Abolitionism in the United Kingdom
 John Quincy Adams and abolitionism
 Compensated emancipation
 African American founding fathers of the United States
 History of slavery
 History of slavery in the United States
 List of opponents of slavery
 James Redpath
 Slavery among Native Americans in the United States
 Slavery in the colonial United States
 Timeline of abolition of slavery and serfdom
 Treatment of the enslaved in the United States
 George Washington and slavery
 Thomas Jefferson and slavery
 Abraham Lincoln and slavery

Notes

References

Sources

Further reading

 Abzug, Robert H. Cosmos Crumbling: American Reform and the Religious Imagination. Oxford, 1994. .
 
 Bacon, Jacqueline.  The Humblest May Stand Forth: Rhetoric, Empowerment, and Abolition. University of South Carolina Press, 2002. .
 Barnes, Gilbert H. The Anti-Slavery Impulse 1830–1844. Reprint, 1964. .
 Berlin, Ira and Leslie Harris (eds.) Slavery in New York. New Press, 2005. .
 Blue, Frederick J.  No Taint of Compromise: Crusaders in Antislavery Politics. Louisiana State University Press, 2004. .
 Bordewich, Fergus M.  Bound for Canaan: The Underground Railroad and the War for the Soul of America. HarperCollins, 2005. .
 Carey, Brycchan. From Peace to Freedom: Quaker Rhetoric and the Birth of American Antislavery, 1657–1761. New Haven, CT: Yale University Press, 2012. 
 Child, Lydia Maria. (1833).  An Appeal in Favor of That Class of Americans Called Africans. Boston: Allen and Ticknor. 
 
 
 Davis, David Brion, Inhuman Bondage: The Rise and Fall of Slavery in the New World Oxford, 2006. .
 Delbanco, Andrew. The Abolitionist Imagination. Cambridge, MA: Harvard University Press, 2012. 
 
 Filler, Louis. The Crusade Against Slavery 1830–1860. 1960. .
  .
 David Nathaniel Gellman. Emancipating New York: The Politics of Slavery And Freedom, 1777–1827 Louisiana State University Press, 2006. .
 Griffin, Clifford S. Their Brothers' Keepers: Moral Stewardship in the United States 1800–1865. Rutgers University Press, 1967. .
 Hammond, John Craig and Matthew Mason (eds.) Contesting Slavery: The Politics of Bondage and Freedom in the New American Nation. Charlottesville, VA: University of Virginia Press, 2011.
 Harrold, Stanley. The Abolitionists and the South, 1831–1861. University Press of Kentucky, 1995. .
 Harrold, Stanley. The American Abolitionists. Longman, 2000. .
 Harrold, Stanley. The Rise of Aggressive Abolitionism: Addresses to the Slaves. University Press of Kentucky, 2004. .
 Hassard, John R. G. The Life of John Hughes: First Archbishop of New York. Arno Press, 1969.
 Horton, James Oliver. "Alexander Hamilton: Slavery and Race in a Revolutionary Generation" New-York Journal of American History 2004 65(3): 16–24. 
 Huston, James L. "The Experiential Basis of the Northern Antislavery Impulse2. Journal of Southern History 56:4 (November 1990): 609–640.
 
 Mayer, Henry All on Fire: William Lloyd Garrison and the Abolition of Slavery St. Martin's Press, 1998. .
 McKivigan, John R. The War Against Proslavery Religion: Abolitionism and the Northern Churches, 1830–1865 Cornell University Press, 1984. .
 McPherson, James M. The Abolitionist Legacy: From Reconstruction to the NAACP. Princeton University Press, 1975. .
 Oakes, James. The Crooked Path to Abolition: Abraham Lincoln and the Antislavery Constitution (W.W. Norton, 2021). 
 Oakes, James. Freedom National: The Destruction of Slavery in the United States, 1861–1865 (W. W. Norton, 2012).
 Osofsky, Gilbert. "Abolitionists, Irish Immigrants, and the Dilemmas of Romantic Nationalism" American Historical Review 1975 80(4): 889–912.  
 Perry, Lewis and Michael Fellman, eds. Antislavery Reconsidered: New Perspectives on the Abolitionists. Louisiana State University Press, 1979. .
 Peterson, Merrill D. John Brown: The Legend Revisited. University Press of Virginia, 2002. .
 
 Pierson, Michael D. Free Hearts and Free Homes: Gender and American Antislavery Politics. University of North Carolina Press, 2003. .
 Quarles, Benjamin. "Sources of Abolitionist Income", Mississippi Valley Historical Review (1945) 32#1 pp. 63–76 in JSTOR 
 Schafer, Judith Kelleher. Becoming Free, Remaining Free: Manumission and Enslavement in New Orleans, 1846–1862. Louisiana State University Press, 2003. .
 Salerno, Beth A. Sister Societies: Women's Antislavery Organizations in Antebellum America. Northern Illinois University Press, 2005. .
 Speicher, Anna M. The Religious World of Antislavery Women: Spirituality in the Lives of Five Abolitionist Lecturers. Syracuse University Press, 2000. .
 Stauffer, John.  The Black Hearts of Men: Radical Abolitionists and the Transformation of Race. Harvard University Press, 2002. .
 
 Vorenberg, Michael.  Final Freedom: The Civil War, the Abolition of Slavery, and the Thirteenth Amendment. Cambridge University Press, 2001. .
 Wilson, Thomas D. The Oglethorpe Plan: Enlightenment Design in Savannah and Beyond. Charlottesville, VA: University of Virginia Press, 2012. .
 Zilversmit, Arthur. The First Emancipation: The Abolition of Slavery in the North. University of Chicago Press, 1967. .

External links

Original Document Proposing Abolition of Slavery 13th Amendment
"John Brown's body and blood" by Ari Kelman: a review in the TLS, 14 February 2007.
Report of the Brown University Steering Committee on Slavery and Justice
Elijah Parish Lovejoy: A Martyr on the Altar of American Liberty 
Teaching resources about Slavery and Abolition on blackhistory4schools.com
John Brown Museum
American Abolitionism
James Monroe Whitfield black Abolitionist poet "America and other poems" 1853
American Abolitionists and Antislavery Activists, comprehensive list of abolitionist and anti-slavery activists and organizations in the United States, including historic biographies and anti-slavery timelines, bibliographies, etc.
Escape to Freedom at scholastic.com
National Underground Railroad Freedom Center in Cincinnati, Ohio
The Liberator Files, Horace Seldon's collection and summary of research of William Lloyd Garrison's The Liberator original copies at the Boston Public Library, Boston, Massachusetts.
University of Detroit Mercy Black Abolitionist Archive, a collection of over 800 speeches by antebellum blacks and approximately 1,000 editorials from the period.
Maps about "Slavery" in the U.S. at the Persuasive Cartography, The PJ Mode Collection, Cornell University Library

 
 
Origins of the American Civil War
Human rights in the United States